Kurand may refer to:
 Kurand, California
 Kurand, Iran